Apple Inc. uses a large variety of typefaces in its marketing, operating systems, and industrial design with each product cycle. These change throughout the years with Apple's change of style in their products. This is evident in the design and marketing of the company.

Marketing
For at least 18 years, Apple's corporate typeface was a custom variant of the ITC Garamond typeface called Apple Garamond. It was used alongside the Apple logo for product names on computers, in many ads and printed materials, and on the company's website. Starting in 2001, Apple gradually shifted towards using Myriad in its marketing. Starting with iPhone 7 in 2016, Apple switched the typeface of the word mark "iPhone" to San Francisco on products and its website.

Hand-drawn logo
Prior to adopting the bitten Apple as its logo, Apple used a complex logo featuring Isaac Newton sitting below an apple tree. The words APPLE COMPUTER CO. were drawn on a ribbon banner ornamenting the picture frame. The frame itself held a quotation from Wordsworth: "Newton....A Mind Forever Voyaging Through Strange Seas of Thought...Alone.", taken from Wordsworth's autobiographical poem The Prelude. The logo was hand drawn and thus did not use an established font. However, the type is similar to Caslon.

Motter Tektura

Before the introduction of the first Macintosh, alongside the Apple logo, Apple used a typeface called Motter Tektura, which was designed in Austria by Othmar Motter of Vorarlberger Graphik in 1975 and distributed by Letraset (and also famously used by Reebok). At the time, the typeface was considered new and modern. One modification to the typeface was the removal of the dot over the i. The s was also modified for the label on the Disk II 5.25-inch floppy disk drive.

According to the logo designer, Rob Janoff, the typeface was selected for its playful qualities and techno look, which were in line with Apple's mission statement of making high technology accessible to anyone. Janoff designed the logo in 1977 while working with Palo Alto marketer Regis McKenna. The Apple logo's bite mark was originally designed to fit snugly with the Motter Tektura a.

In the early 1980s, the logo was simplified by removing computer . from the logo. Motter Tektura was also used for the Apple II logo. This typeface has sometimes been mislabeled Cupertino, a similar bitmap font probably created to mimic Motter Tektura.

Apple Garamond

Since the introduction of the Macintosh in 1984, Apple adopted a new corporate font called Apple Garamond. It was a variation of the classic Garamond typeface, both narrower and having a taller x-height. Specifically, ITC Garamond (created by Tony Stan in 1977) was condensed to 80% of its normal width. Bitstream condensed the font, subtly adjusted the stroke widths, and performed the hinting required to create the font, which was delivered to Apple as the Postscript font "apgaram".

In cases where the Apple logo was accompanied by text, it was always set in Apple Garamond. Aside from the company name, most of Apple's advertising and marketing slogans, such as "Think different.", used the font as well.

The typeface was virtually synonymous with Apple for almost two decades and formed a large part of the company's brand recognition. It was used not only in conjunction with the logo, but also in manuals and ads and to label products with model names.

Apple has not released the true Apple Garamond font. ITC briefly sold ITC Garamond Narrow—Apple Garamond without the custom hinting—as part of its Apple Font Pack in the 1990s. A version of the font was also included under a different name in some versions of Mac OS X prior to 10.3 as it was used by the Setup Assistant installation program.

Gill Sans
In the marketing of the Newton/Notepad/MessagePad PDA (starting in 1992), Apple used Gill Sans instead of the regular Apple Garamond. Gill Sans Regular was used in the logo, for the model name on the computer, on the keyboard and in advertisement materials, though it was not used as a screen font (except as part of the Newton logo).

Myriad

In 2003, Apple gradually started using a variant of the Adobe Myriad font family in its marketing and packaging. As new revisions of its products were released, the text changed from the serif Apple Garamond to the sans-serif Myriad Apple. The family's bolds were used for headlines, and other weights accordingly.

The Myriad font family was designed by Robert Slimbach and Carol Twombly for Adobe. Adobe's most recent version of Myriad is Myriad Pro, which has some additional enhancements and character set extensions, but is not significantly changed in design. Myriad Apple, a modification produced by Galápagos Design Group, incorporates minor spacing and weight differences from the standard varieties, and includes Apple-specific characters, such as the company logo. In 2006, Myriad Apple was superseded by Myriad Set, which contains extra ligatures and other minor changes.

As of November 2013, lighter fonts are prevalent in Apple's marketing, with headlines in Myriad Pro Light. Occasionally an even lighter variant of Myriad is used for specialized marketing materials and press releases.

San Francisco
Starting with the release of the Apple Watch, Apple has begun usage of San Francisco as the typeface of word marks such as "iPhone", "AirPods", and "MacBook Pro" on the devices themselves. This change is also reflected on some headlines on product marketing webpages. Apple modified the majority of its website's text to use the San Francisco font on January 24, 2017, and San Francisco became the universal official font for Apple.

System fonts
Apple has used a variety of system fonts for the user interface of its products.

Early fonts
Apple's earliest computers, along with other personal computers of the period, had extremely limited graphical capabilities and could originally display only uppercase ASCII using a set bitmap font. The IIc and Enhanced Apple IIe expanded on this, supporting 40 or 80 columns of text and an extended character set called MouseText. It was used to simulate simple graphical user interfaces, similar to the use of ANSI X3.64.

The first Apple computer with a purely bitmapped display, the Lisa, shipped in 1983. It used a system font with distinctive V and W letterforms.

Chicago and Charcoal

The Macintosh, introduced in 1984, used a bitmap font, Chicago, designed by Susan Kare. In Mac OS 8, introduced in 1997, the system font of Mac OS was changed to Charcoal. Charcoal was designed by David Berlow of Font Bureau, to be easier to read than Chicago, while retaining similar metrics for backward compatibility with existing application software.

When released in 2001, Apple's iPod music player reused the Macintosh font Chicago as the system font. Later versions of the iPod drew from the larger character repertoire of the TrueType Chicago, adding a number of characters not present in the bitmap Chicago, such as Greek and Cyrillic. Even though the screen supported grayscale, the characters were not anti-aliased.

Geneva
For smaller user interface elements, such as the names of files displayed with icons in the Finder, Apple used the Geneva typeface, a redesigned version of Helvetica.

Shaston
Introduced in 1986, the Apple IIGS, had very tall pixels (pixel aspect ratio of 5:12 or 5:6, with 640 × 200 or 320 × 200 pixels in a 4:3 image), thus requiring a stout, 8-point bitmap font called Shaston 8 as the system font (for menus, window titles, etc.). Shaston was described in Apple IIGS technote #41 as "a modified Helvetica", but the similarities are not striking. The fonts of the original Macintosh were also available for the GS.

Espy Sans
In 1991, Apple's Human Interface Group contracted with LetterPerfect Fonts' Garrett Boge and Damon Clark, to design a family of bitmap screen fonts to replace Chicago and Geneva for the Mac OS version 7.5. The family consisted of Sans & Serif, Regular and Bold in discrete bitmap sizes of 8, 9, 10, 12 & 14 pt. The Sans, proving most useful for screen readability, was also used for the Newton OS GUI. The Newton used the font Apple Casual to display text entered using the Rosetta handwriting recognition engine in the Newton. The same font found its way into the Rosetta-derived writing recognition system in Mac OS X—Inkwell. The TrueType font can be made available to any application by copying the font file, which is embedded in a system component, to any font folder. (See List of macOS fonts for more information.) The Newton logo featured the Gill Sans typeface, which was also used for the Newton keyboard.

Espy Sans was later used as the font for Apple's eWorld online service in 1994. (eWorld also used the larger bold condensed bitmap font eWorld Tight for headlines. The metrics of eWorld Tight were based on Helvetica Ultra Compressed.) The iPod mini, released in 2004, also used Espy Sans.

Lucida Grande
Since its introduction in 2000 up through OS X Mavericks, Lucida Grande was the system font used in Mac OS X user interface elements, such as menus, dialog boxes, and other widgets. It was superseded by Helvetica Neue.

Podium Sans
Starting in 2004, the iPod photo, 5th-generation iPod, and 1st- through 2nd-generation iPod nano feature a bitmap font known as Podium Sans, displacing the use of Chicago as the iPod system font. Although originally promoted as Myriad, Podium Sans is missing Myriad's trademark features, such as the splayed "M" and distinctive "y".

Helvetica
Since the introduction of the 1st-generation iPhone in 2007, Apple has used Helvetica in its software design. iOS for the iPhone, iPod touch, iPad, and Apple TV employs the font, alongside its use on iPods beginning with the 6th-generation iPod classic and 3rd-generation iPod nano.

In conjunction with the iPhone 4 in 2010, Apple began using Helvetica Neue on devices with Retina display, while keeping use of Helvetica on non-Retina devices.

Around 2012, Apple started using Helvetica in macOS (then named OS X) application software. iTunes, iMovie, iPhoto, GarageBand, and Apple's professional applications started to feature heavy use of Helvetica, while the majority of the OS X (now named macOS) environment retained the comparatively more legible Lucida Grande typeface, which was designed specifically for on-screen use.

After the introduction of iOS 7 in June 2013, Apple began using an extra-thin weight of Helvetica Neue for the user interface of iOS 7, arousing numerous complaints about the less legible typography. For the final release of the operating system, Apple changed the system's font to a slightly thicker weight of Helvetica Neue, although some have complained that readability is still compromised compared to the font weight used in former versions of iOS. Older iOS devices continue to use Helvetica or Helvetica Neue in regular font weights that display with higher contrast on low-resolution displays.

With the introduction of OS X 10.10 "Yosemite" in June 2014, Apple started using Helvetica Neue as the system font on the Mac. This brought all of Apple's user interfaces in line, using Helvetica Neue throughout.

San Francisco

San Francisco is currently used for user interface across all of Apple's product line, including watchOS, macOS, iOS, iPadOS and tvOS (with the notable exception of subtitles on tvOS which continues to use Helvetica). The three main variants are SF Pro for macOS, iOS, and iPadOS; SF Compact for watchOS; and SF Mono for the Terminal, Console, and Xcode applications. It was first introduced alongside the Apple Watch, where it was used for enhanced legibility and taller x-heights for easy reading on a small display. The design references a number of different other typefaces, notably FF DIN (used in the UI of the Camera app in iOS 7 and above), Helvetica (used in the UI in iOS 6 and below), Helvetica Neue (used in the UI of iOS 7 and iOS 8 as well as OS X Yosemite), Roboto (Google's new UI typeface), and Univers (used on Apple's early keyboard designs).

It was widely speculated that San Francisco was going to be the long-awaited font that Apple had reportedly been developing for independent use in their products, and the font's name was leaked in November 2014 when the WatchKit SDK was released to developers. On June 8, 2015, at the WWDC 2015 conference, San Francisco replaced Helvetica Neue as the system font for both macOS and iOS operating systems. The version used, known as "SF UI", was modified to make it wider than its Apple Watch counterpart, more akin to the previously used Helvetica Neue. The original version has since been renamed "SF Compact".

New York
In 2019, Apple released New York, a serif counterpart to San Francisco.

Keyboards

Apple's keyboards were long labeled with Univers 47 (Condensed Light Oblique), a design choice by Apple's industrial design partner, Frog Design. This began in 1984 with the Apple IIc, which had tilted front-panel buttons to match the inclination of the lettering.

Univers was eventually replaced on Apple's keyboards by VAG Rounded, which was used on all iBook models, PowerBooks introduced after 2003, and MacBooks, MacBooks Pro, MacBooks Air, and Apple Keyboards from August 2007 until early 2015. The font was developed by Sedley Place Ltd. for German car manufacturer Volkswagen and was used in much of their marketing materials.

On March 9, 2015, Apple introduced a new generation of MacBook that utilizes the Apple designed San Francisco typeface.

See also
 Fonts on Macintosh
 List of Apple typefaces
 List of typefaces included with macOS

References

General references
 Apple Computer:
 Fonts on Mac OS X. Retrieved 2004-09-25.
 (January 29, 2003). Using and Managing Fonts in Mac OS X. PDF. Retrieved 2004-10-01.
 (October 8, 2003). Fonts in Mac OS X PDF. Retrieved 2004-10-04.
 Font Support in the Mac OS. Retrieved 2004-10-01.
 (November 11, 2002). LastResort Font. Retrieved 2004-10-03.
 (June 10, 2004). Sharing Fonts Between Mac OS X and Classic. Retrieved 2004-10-22.
 (September 14, 2000). The Zapf table. Retrieved 2004-10-22.
 (1996-07-06). Inside Macintosh — Text — Built-in Script Support (IM: Tx). Retrieved 2004-10-27.
 (November 1990). Apple II GS TN #41 — Font Family Numbers. Retrieved 2004-10-28.
 (December 19, 2002). ROMAN.TXT, MacRoman to Unicode map. Retrieved 2004-11-09.
 Jaques Moury Beauchap. Rob Janoff — Graphic Designer, Author of the first logo for Apple Computer. Retrieved 2004-10-28.
 Michael Everson (2003-11-11). Multilingual Macintosh Support. Retrieved 2004-10-27.
 Erfert Fenton (October 1994). Inside QuickDraw GX Fonts, MacWorld. , retrieved 2004-11-01.
 FreeType. Freetype and Patents. Retrieved 2004-10-29.
 Nobumi Iyanaga (2000-09-26). Unicode and Mac OS, and Code converters. Retrieved 2004-10-27.
 Tony Kavadias (2004-07-24). Apple II User Interfaces. Retrieved 2004-10-28.
 Steve Gibson (2003-04-10). The Origins of Sub-Pixel Font Rendering. Retrieved 2004-10-27.
 Jens Hofman Hansen (July 2, 2002). Apple-logoets historie. Retrieved 2004-09-22.
 Susan Kare. World Class Cities. Retrieved 2004-09-25.
 John Kheyt (2003-05-23). The Devil's Advocate — MS's ClearType KOs Apple's Quartz In The Lightweight Division. Retrieved 2004-10-27.
 Microsoft (2003-03-12). Press release: Microsoft Announces Expanded Access To Extensive Intellectual Property Portfolio. Retrieved 2004-10-27.
 Jonathan Ploudre (June 1, 2000). Macintosh System Fonts. Retrieved 2004-09-21.
 Ed Tracy (1998-10-15). Apple and the History of Personal Computer Design. Retrieved 2004-10-27.
 Norman Walsh (August 14, 1996). comp.fonts FAQ: Macintosh Info. Retrieved 2004-09-21.
 XvsXP. XvsXP.com — Fonts. Retrieved 2004-10-27.

External links
 Advanced Typography with Mac OS X Tiger
 Text & Fonts Apple's typography developer site
 TrueType Reference Manual
 LastResort Font
 Full LastResort glyph table
 LastResort glyphs: — 236 pages PDF, 5 pages PDF
 Unicode fonts for Mac OS X computers — Survey of Unicode fonts included with Mac OS X and Microsoft Office 2004.
 Microsoft's ClearType website
 Fondu – program to convert (and separate) Mac OS X dfont data fork files to TrueType, OpenType, Type 1, and Glyph Bitmap parts
 MacKeys — online tool to convert Apple keyboard keys to their Unicode equivalents (e.g. Cmd → ⌘)

Apple